Richard Van Dyck (1717–1770) was an American silversmith, engraver, and importer active in New York City.

Van Dyck was the son of silversmith Peter Van Dyck, and christened on December 4, 1717, in New York City. In 1746 he was commissioned to engrave the bills of credit that helped to finance an invasion of Canada during King George's War. From 1750-1756 he occasionally advertised his shop at Hanover Square, and appears to have abandoned working in silver sometime between 1753 and 1756 as he became an importer of decorative items from Europe and the Orient. In 1753 he advertised wrought plate, looking glasses, sconces, European and Indian goods, and best "Florence oyl."

His work is collected in the Metropolitan Museum of Art and Yale University Art Gallery.

References 
 "Richard Van Dyck", American Silversmiths.
 "Richard Van Dyck", Online Encyclopedia of Silver Marks, Hallmarks, and Makers' Marks.
 American Rococo, 1750-1775: Elegance in Ornament, Morrison H. Heckscher, Leslie Greene Bowman, Metropolitan Museum of Art, 1992, page 109.
 Catalogue of an exhibition of silver used in New York, New Jersey and the South: with a note on early New York silversmiths, Richard Townley Haines Halsey, The Gilliss Press, 1911, page xxx.
 American Silver of the XVII & XVIII Centuries: A Study Based on the Clearwater Collection, Alphonso Trumpbour Clearwater, Clara Louise Avery, Metropolitan Museum of Art, 1920, page 108.

American silversmiths
1717 births
1770 deaths